Mimeresia favillacea is a butterfly in the family Lycaenidae. It is found in Cameroon, Equatorial Guinea, Gabon and Uganda. The habitat consists of forests.

Subspecies
 Mimeresia favillacea favillacea (southern Cameroon, Equatorial Guinea, Gabon)
 Mimeresia favillacea griseata (Talbot, 1937) (Uganda, Democratic Republic of the Congo: Sankuru and Lualaba)

References

Butterflies described in 1910
Poritiinae